Jerzy Janicki (10 August 1928 in Chortkiv – 15 April 2007 in Warsaw) was a Polish writer, journalist and scriptwriter. Author of many radio auditions, among them most famous is the radio drama Matysiakowie. He wrote many books about Kresy, particularly about the city of Lwów (now Lviv, Ukraine).

External links
 Zmarł pisarz i scenarzysta Jerzy Janicki, Gazeta Wyborcza, 2007-04-15,

1928 births
2007 deaths
People from Chortkiv
Polish male dramatists and playwrights
Commanders with Star of the Order of Polonia Restituta
Officers of the Order of Polonia Restituta
Knights of the Order of Polonia Restituta
Recipients of the Gold Medal for Merit to Culture – Gloria Artis
20th-century Polish dramatists and playwrights
20th-century Polish male writers